General Sir Charles John Cecil Grant,  (13 August 1877 – 9 November 1950) was a senior British Army officer. He saw active service in the Second Boer War in South Africa from 1899 to 1902, in the Great War of 1914 to 1918, and was a general officer during the 1930s and the early stages of the Second World War.

Military career
Grant was commissioned a second lieutenant in the Coldstream Guards on 20 February 1897, and promoted to lieutenant on 11 May 1898. He served in the Second Boer War in South Africa from 1899 to 1902, where he was part of the Kimberley relief force, and was wounded at the Battle of Belmont in November 1899. Following the end of the war he was appointed adjutant of the 1st Battalion of his regiment on 1 July 1902.

He also served in the First World War, initially as a brigade major for 3rd Infantry Brigade which formed part of the British Expeditionary Force (BEF) deployed to France in 1914. He was a General Staff Officer in various formations before becoming temporary Commander of 1st Infantry Brigade in 1917. In 1918 he was assigned to General Headquarters of the French Army, as a liaison officer between General Sir Henry Wilson, Chief of the Imperial General Staff and French Marshal Ferdinand Foch. He was awarded the Distinguished Service Order (DSO), seven times Mentioned in dispatches and wounded during the war.

He became Commanding Officer of the 3rd Battalion the Coldstream Guards in 1919 moving on to join the General Staff in Egypt in 1921. In 1925 he became Commander of 137th (Staffordshire) Brigade and in 1927 Commander of 8th Infantry Brigade.

In 1930 he became General Officer Commanding the 53rd (Welsh) Division and in 1932 Major-General commanding the Brigade of Guards and General Officer Commanding the London District. In 1937 he was appointed General Officer Commanding in Chief of Scottish Command and Governor of Edinburgh Castle, retiring from that posting in 1940.

He was also Honorary Colonel of the King's Shropshire Light Infantry from 1930 to 1946.

He owned and lived much of his life at Pitchford Hall in Shropshire. He served as a deputy lieutenant for the county in 1946.

Family
He was married in 1903 to Lady Sybil Myra Caroline Primrose (1879–1955), eldest daughter of Archibald Primrose, 5th Earl of Rosebery, who had served as British Prime Minister from 1894 to 1895. They had one son, Charles Robert Archibald Grant (1903-1972), who married Pamela Wellesley (1912-1987), a granddaughter of the 4th Duke of Wellington.

Later life
Grant died at his wife's property, The Durdans, Epsom, Surrey, aged 73, in November 1950, and was buried in the family grave at Balmacaan, Glen Urquhart, Inverness-shire, Scotland.

References

Bibliography

External links
Generals of World War II

|-

|-

 

|-
 

1877 births
1950 deaths
British Army generals
Burials in Scotland
Deputy Lieutenants of Shropshire
Knights Commander of the Order of the Bath
Knights Commander of the Royal Victorian Order
Companions of the Distinguished Service Order
Coldstream Guards officers
British Army personnel of the Second Boer War
British Army generals of World War I
British Army generals of World War II
Military personnel from London